The Lichinga Solar Power Station, is a planned  solar power plant in Mozambique. The solar farm is under development by a consortium comprising Gigawatt Global, a  Dutch multinational IPP and the Anglican Church of Niassa, based in Niassa Province, in northwestern Mozambique. The energy generated here is to be sold to Electricidade de Moçambique (EDM), the Mozambican public electric utility company, for distribution to Lago District, Mecula District, Mecanhelas District, Mavago District and Mandimba District.

Location
The power station is located in the city of Lichinga, the capital of both Lichinga District and Niassa Province.

Overview
In August 2019, Gigawatt Global and the Anglican Church of Niassa committed in writing, to jointly invest US$200 million to design, construct, own and operate this renewable energy infrastructure project. The energy generated here, to be sold to EDM for distribution in six districts of Niassa Province, to stabilize the national grid there, create employment and spur economic and social development.

Developers
The power station was developed by a consortium, which owns the station. For descriptive purposes we will call that consortium: Gigawatt Solar Consortium. The consortium comprises the corporate entities listed in the table below.

Other considerations
Feasibility studies were expected to begin in September 2019. The outcome of those studies would inform the selection of the EPC contractor. It is expected that at least 200 individuals would be employed in the construction phase of this project. Other benefits include the boost to local businesses in the areas of transport, accommodation, catering and retail sales of fast moving consumer goods.

See also

List of power stations in Mozambique

References

External links
 Approximate location of Lichinga Solar Power Plant

Solar power stations in Mozambique
Niassa Province
Lichinga District
Energy infrastructure in Mozambique